Philip A. Baddour Jr. (born August 5, 1942) was a  Democratic member of the North Carolina House of Representatives, representing the 11th district from 1993 through 2002. He was also House Democratic leader for two terms.

Baddour is currently chairman of the Clean Water Management Trust Fund and president of the North Carolina Advocates for Justice, one of the state's leading groups of attorneys. He has also served on the Commission for the Future of the Courts in North Carolina, the North Carolina Economic Development Board and the North Carolina Board of Transportation. He is a past president of the Goldsboro Area Chamber of Commerce, the Wayne County Economic Development Commission and the Goldsboro Rotary Club. Baddour is also a retired Colonel with the North Carolina National Guard, where he served as Staff Judge Advocate.

References

External links
North Carolina General Assembly - Vote History: Representative Baddour (District 11) voting history (2001-2002 session)
Baddour, Parker & Hine, PC - Philip A. Baddour, Jr. attorney profile
Follow the Money - Phil Baddour
2002 2000 1998 1996 campaign contributions

|-

Members of the North Carolina House of Representatives
Living people
21st-century American politicians
1942 births